Denisa Chládková (born 8 February 1979) is a former professional tennis player from the Czech Republic.

Life and career 
Chládková did not win any WTA Tour titles, but she is probably best remembered for reaching the Wimbledon quarterfinals in 1997, playing in only her third Grand Slam main draw. In the second round, she stunned Lindsay Davenport for the first top-ten win of her career, but eventually lost to the champion, Martina Hingis.

Despite not winning any titles, she reached WTA Tour singles finals. The biggest of these was at the Tier-II event held in Hanover, Germany, where she lost to Serena Williams. She also finished runner-up at Knokke-Heist, losing to María Sánchez Lorenzo and Helsinki, losing to Svetlana Kuznetsova.

On 16 June 2003, she ascended to her career-high ranking of No. 31 in the world. That same year she advanced to the fourth round of the Australian Open, her best Grand Slam result since her memorable Wimbledon quarterfinal run six years previously.

During her career, she had wins over Lindsay Davenport, Barbara Schett, Anke Huber, Chanda Rubin, Silvia Farina Elia, Tamarine Tanasugarn and Magdalena Maleeva.

WTA career finals

Singles: 3 (runner-ups)

ITF finals

Singles (7–2)

Doubles (4–2)

Grand Slam singles performance timeline

References

External links
 
 
 
  

1979 births
Living people
Czech female tennis players
Tennis players from Prague